Hiroshima mon amour (lit.), is a 1959 romantic drama film directed by French director Alain Resnais and written by French author Marguerite Duras.

Resnais' first feature-length work, it was a co-production between France and Japan, and documents a series of intensely personal conversations (or one long conversation) over slightly more than a 24-hour period between an unnamed French actress and Japanese architect. The film is notable for Resnais' innovative use of brief flashbacks to suggest flashes of memory, which create a nonlinear storyline.

Along with films such as Breathless (1960) and The 400 Blows (1959), Hiroshima mon amour brought international attention to the new movement in French cinema and is widely considered to be one of the most influential films of the French New Wave. In particular, it was a major catalyst for Left Bank Cinema.

Plot
A series of closeups of the backs and arms of a man and woman embracing, amidst falling ash and then covered in sweat. In voiceover, the woman recounts the aftermath of the atomic bombing of Hiroshima that she has seen on her trip to the city, while newsreel and fictional footage of victims, protests, war memorials, and the streets and buildings of modern Hiroshima are shown. The man calmly says the woman has not seen anything, nor does she know what it is to forget. He is from Hiroshima and his family died in the bombing while he was off fighting in the war, and the woman is a French actress who is in the city to make an anti-war film.

In the morning, the woman watches the man sleep. His twitching hand reminds her of her first love, a soldier whose hand moved similarly as he lay dying. The Japanese man wakes, and it becomes clear he and the woman met the previous night at a café. She learns he is an architect who is involved in politics. They discuss the bombing and the end of the war, and he is enchanted by the word "Nevers", her hometown, to which she never wants to return. The man says he would like to see the woman again, but she says she is flying back to Paris the next day. Neither this nor the revelation that she has children change how he feels, but she, though torn, repeatedly declines to arrange another meeting.

The man visits the woman at the filming location, and she is happy to see him. He takes her back to his house. She asks if he lives alone, and he replies that his wife is out of town for a few days. They both say they are happy in their marriages, though they have had casual affairs before, and make love again. After deciding to spend the woman's remaining time in Hiroshima together, they go to a tea room, where the man asks the woman to tell him more about Nevers and her life there. Intercut with flashbacks, she tells how she and an occupying German soldier fell in love and planned to elope to Bavaria before he was shot while waiting for her on the day Nevers was liberated, how she stayed with him while he died over the next two days, how the villagers shaved her head when they found out about the relationship, and how her parents locked her alternately in her room and the cellar while her hair grew out and she came out of her madness and then sent her away to Paris just before Hiroshima was bombed. She tries to convey the pain she feels about forgetting the German and their love, and indicates she has been trying to keep her distance from the Japanese man because she does not want any more such heartbreak.

The man is elated when he learns the woman never told her husband about the German, but, when they leave the tea room, she tells him to go away and that they will probably never see each other again. In her hotel room, she feels guilty about telling the man about the German, but decides to stay in Hiroshima. She goes back to the now-closed tea room, and the man finds her and asks her to stay. She weakly says she will, but then tells him again to go away. They walk around the city, together and separately, images of Hiroshima alternating with images of Nevers. The woman goes to a train station, where she lets go of some of her issues surrounding her first love and decides she might like to visit Nevers. She takes a cab to a nightclub, the man following. The place is nearly empty and they sit apart. As the sun rises, a Japanese man sits by the woman and hits on her in English.

Back in the woman's hotel room, the architect knocks at the door. She lets him in and yells that she is already starting to forget him, but abruptly calms and says his name is "Hiroshima". He responds that it is, and her name is "Nevers".

Cast
 Emmanuelle Riva as Elle ("Her")
 Eiji Okada as Lui ("Him")
 Bernard Fresson as l'Allemand ("The German")
 Stella Dassas as la mère ("The Mother")
 Pierre Barbaud as le père ("The Father")

Production
According to James Monaco, Resnais was originally commissioned to make a short documentary about the atomic bomb, but spent several months confused about how to proceed because he did not want to recreate his 1956 Holocaust documentary Night and Fog. He later went to his producer and joked that the film could not be done unless Marguerite Duras was involved in writing the screenplay.

The film was a co-production by companies from both France and Japan. The producers stipulated that one main character must be French and the other Japanese, and also required that the film be shot in both countries employing film crews comprising technicians from each.

Among the film's innovations is the way Resnais intercut very brief flashback sequences into scenes to suggest a brief flash of memory. He later used a similar effect in Last Year at Marienbad (1961) and The War Is Over (1966).

Film references
In his book on Resnais, James Monaco ends his chapter on Hiroshima mon amour by claiming that the film contains a reference to the classic 1942 film Casablanca:

Release
The uncensored version of the film was shown at the Montreal International Film Festival in 1960, but was censored for its Canadian theatrical release.

Reception and legacy
At the 1959 Cannes Film Festival, where the film was excluded from the official selection because of its sensitive subject matter of nuclear bombs and to avoid upsetting the U.S. government, the film won the FIPRESCI International Critics' Prize, and it won the prestigious Grand Prix from the Belgian Film Critics Association in 1960. For her work on the film, screenwriter Marguerite Duras was nominated for the award for Best Original Screenplay at the 33rd Academy Awards. In 2002, the film was voted by the international contributors of the French film magazine Positif to be one of the top 10 films since 1952, when the magazine was founded.

Hiroshima mon amour has been described as "The Birth of a Nation of the French New Wave" by American critic Leonard Maltin. New Wave filmmaker Jean-Luc Godard described its inventiveness as "Faulkner plus Stravinsky" and celebrated the film's originality, calling it "the first film without any cinematic references". Filmmaker Eric Rohmer said: "I think that in a few years, in ten, twenty, or thirty years, we will know whether Hiroshima mon amour was the most important film since the war, the first modern film of sound cinema".

The Dutch actor Rutger Hauer cited Hiroshima mon amour as one of his favorite films.

The film was shown as part of the Cannes Classics section of the 2013 Cannes Film Festival and was screened nine times at the Harvard Film Archive between 28 November and 13 December 2014.

Cultural errors
In Japan Journals: 1947-2004, film historian Donald Richie writes in an entry for 25 January 1960 of seeing the film in Tokyo and remarks on various distracting (for the Japanese) cultural errors which Resnais made. He notes, for example, that the Japanese-language arrival and departure time announcements in the train scenes bear no relation to the time of day in which the scenes are set. Also, people pass through noren curtains into shops which are supposedly closed. The noren is a traditional sign that a shop is open for business and is invariably taken down at closing time.

In popular culture

Music
The film has inspired several songs.
 The English band Ultravox recorded a song called "Hiroshima Mon Amour" for their 1977 album Ha!-Ha!-Ha!. The song was later covered by the Australian band The Church on their all-covers album A Box of Birds in 1999. Another notable version was recorded by Jan Linton on his King Records Japan-only album Planet Japan in 2004. The song is still performed live by former Ultravox! singer John Foxx, with his current group John Foxx and the Maths.
 In 1983, the rock band Alcatrazz recorded a song called "Hiroshima Mon Amour" for their debut album No Parole from Rock 'n' Roll. The song was written by English singer Graham Bonnet (ex-Rainbow) with Swedish guitar virtuoso Yngwie Malmsteen. Bonnet’s lyrics and song title were inspired by the film, which he had seen in school. The song became one of the band’s most popular and was still being performed live (in 2017) by the Graham Bonnet Band.
 In 2004, the Peruvian band El Hombre Misterioso released the album Pez Raro, which included the song "Mon Amour". The lyrics and song title were inspired by the film. The line "Hiroshima Mon Amour" is heard in the chorus.
 In 2008, The (International) Noise Conspiracy released the album The Cross of My Calling, which included the song "Hiroshima Mon Amour".
 John Cale's 1979 album Sabotage features the song "Dr. Mudd", which references Hiroshima Mon Amour.

Film
 In 2001, Japanese film director Nobuhiro Suwa directed H Story, a docufiction about his attempt to remake Hiroshima Mon Amour.
 In 2003, Iranian film director Bahman Pour-Azar released Where Or When. The 85-minute film places Pour-Azar's characters in the same circumstances as Resnais's nearly a half century later. However, the current global tension of today's world is the backdrop instead of post-war Hiroshima. When screening the film, Stuart Alson, who founded the New York International Independent Film and Video Festival, said the piece was "a parallel line of work with the French masterpiece Hiroshima mon amour".

See also
 List of avant-garde films of the 1950s

References

Works cited

External links

 
 
 
 
 Hiroshima mon amour: Time Indefinite – an essay by Kent Jones at The Criterion Collection

1959 films
1959 romantic drama films
1950s avant-garde and experimental films
1950s French films
1950s French-language films
1950s Japanese films
1950s Japanese-language films
Existentialist films
Films about interracial romance
Films about the atomic bombings of Hiroshima and Nagasaki
Films directed by Alain Resnais
Films produced by Anatole Dauman
Films scored by Georges Delerue
Films scored by Giovanni Fusco
Films set in Hiroshima
Films shot in France
Films shot in Hiroshima
French avant-garde and experimental films
French black-and-white films
French romantic drama films
Japan in non-Japanese culture
Japanese avant-garde and experimental films
Japanese black-and-white films
Japanese romantic drama films